The New South Wales Minister for Cities is a minister in the Government of New South Wales with responsibility for dividing Sydney into three separate cities, and interconnecting them with the cities of Central Coast, Newcastle and Wollongong to form connections between the six cities in "north-south" and "east-west" axes.

The current Minister for Cities is Rob Stokes, who is also the Minister for Infrastructure and Minister for Active Transport, and was sworn in on 21 December 2021. In the second Perrottet ministry since December 2021, it is one of the six ministries in the transport sector and the Minister (for Infrastructure, Cities and Active Transport) works with the Minister for Transport, the Minister for Metropolitan Roads and the Minister for Regional Transport and Roads. Together they administer the portfolio through the Department of Transport (Transport for NSW) and a range of other government agencies that coordinate funding arrangements for transport operators, including hundreds of local and community transport operators.

Roles and responsibilities
The portfolio was created in the second Perrottet ministry. The minister's responsibilities are held jointly with the portfolios of Planning and Active Trnasport. These include 
 Callan Park
 Centennial Park and Moore Park;
 Newcastle National Park, including the Number 1 Sports Ground;
 Parramatta Park and Old Government House;
 Royal Botanic Gardens and The Domain;
 Sydney Olympic Park; and
 Western Sydney Parklands.

List of ministers

See also 

List of New South Wales government agencies

References

External links 
Transport for New South Wales

Cities